Fairfield Inn may refer to:
Fairfield Inn (Fairfield, Pennsylvania), a historic inn listed on the NRHP in Pennsylvania
Fairfield Inn (Cashiers, North Carolina), listed on the NRHP in North Carolina
Fairfield Inn by Marriott, a chain of hotels